Jin-sung, also spelled Jin-seong, is a Korean unisex given name. The meaning differs based on the hanja used to write each syllable of the name. There are 48 hanja with the reading "jin" and 27 hanja with the reading "sung" and on the South Korean government's official list of hanja which may be used in given names.

People with this name include:
Temple name of Jinseong of Silla (birth name Gim Man, 865–897), queen of Silla
Lee Jin-sung (born 1956), South Korean judge, president of the Constitutional Court of Korea since 2012
Jang Jin-sung (born 1971), pseudonym of North Korean male poet who defected to South Korea in 2004
Choi Jin-sung (director) (born 1975), South Korean male film director
Hwang Jin-sung (born 1984), South Korean male footballer
Kim Jin-sung (born 1985), South Korean male baseball player
Monday Kiz (singer) (born Kim Jin-sung, 1985), South Korean male singer-songwriter
Yang Jin-sung (born 1988), South Korean actress

See also
List of Korean given names

References

Korean unisex given names